Artifakt is a compilation album by Better Than Ezra, sold only at the band's concerts and through the official Better Than Ezra merchandise website beginning in 2001. The previously rare and unreleased songs comprising the album span the band's entire career, including outtakes and b-sides from their officially released albums as well as re-recorded material from their cassette-only first release, Surprise.

Track listing
"Tremble"
"Strange Funny Way"
"Oh, Corrina"
"Falling Apart"
"Wallflower"
"Use Me" (Bill Withers)
"Rarely Spoken"
"Silly Fool"
"Wintercoats"
"Mercy"
"State Street State of Mind"
"Loaded" (Hidden track following "State Street State of Mind")
"Mr. Greaves" (Hidden track following "Loaded")

Personnel
Kevin Griffin – vocals, guitar
Joel Rundell – guitar
Tom Drummond – bass guitar
Cary Bonnecaze – drums
Travis Aaron McNabb – drums

Better Than Ezra albums
2001 compilation albums